Palaeocarcharias is an extinct genus of shark, known from the Middle-Late Jurassic of Europe. It has only a single named species, P. stromeri, which is known from exceptionally preserved specimens from the Late Jurassic (Tithonian) of Germany. However, it shares greater similarities in tooth development with mackerel sharks (Lamniformes), including the absence of orthodentine, and is now considered to be the earliest known member of the Lamniformes.

References 

Lamniformes
Prehistoric cartilaginous fish genera